József Tuza (June 3, 1926 – July 27, 2008) was a Hungarian sprint canoer who competed in the early 1950s. He won a silver medal in the C-2 1000 m event at the 1954 ICF Canoe Sprint World Championships in Mâcon. Tuza also finished fifth in the C-2 1000 m event at the 1952 Summer Olympics in Helsinki.

References

Sports-reference.com József Tuza's profile at Sports Reference.com
József Tuza's obituary 

1926 births
2008 deaths
Canoeists at the 1952 Summer Olympics
Hungarian male canoeists
Olympic canoeists of Hungary
ICF Canoe Sprint World Championships medalists in Canadian
20th-century Hungarian people